The following is a list of ancient peace treaties:

The Treaty of Kadesh (1274 BC) - peace treaty made after the Battle of Kadesh between Ancient Egyptians, under Rameses II and the Hittites, under Muwatalli II (see Hattusilis II who finalized the treaty)
 The Peace of Callias (449 BC) -  between the Delian League (led by Athens) and Persia, ending the Persian Wars.
The Treaty of the Thirty Years Peace (446 BC/445 BC) - treaty between the ancient Greek city-states Athens and Sparta
Peace of Antalcidas (387 BC) - King Artaxerxes II that ended the Corinthian War in ancient Greece.
Peace of Philocrates (346 BC)

See also
List of treaties
List of wars extended by diplomatic irregularity

References

Ancient